Camilla Gervide (born 17 November 1980) is a Swedish blogger, who runs a celebrity gossip blog and is the most read blogger in Sweden according to Bloggportalen.

Education and career
Gervide was born in Småland and graduated from Åkrahällskola in Nybro in 1999. When young, she was a musician and participated in a music show on TV, and wrote the signature tune for the documentary Tille's resa TV4 in Sweden. She then worked for Nyheter24, Sveriges Television, Nyhetsmorgon, Digster Magazine, VeckoRevyn, Frida, Maybelline and Tunigo.

She started blogging in 1999 and in 2010, she began to blog seriously about music, interviewing a number of celebrities. Since 2016 she runs the blog Bloggbevakning about social media.

Recognition
In 2012, she was nominated for Blogger of the Year at the VeckoRevyn Blog Awards.

References
 Nyheter24
 Swedish television TV4 - Nyhetsmorgon
 Swedish Television - TV4 - Nyhetsmorgon 2
 Swedish Television - TV4 - Nyhetsmorgon 3
 Veckorevyns Bloggawards, VeckoRevyn

External links
 www.bloggbevakning.com

Swedish bloggers
Swedish women bloggers
Living people
1980 births
21st-century Swedish women